Cylance Pro Cycling was a professional women's cycling team based in the United States of America that started competing in elite women's road bicycle racing events, such as the UCI Women's World Tour, in 2016. The team's major sponsor, Cylance, was a high-tech computer security firm, and the team was owned by Inspire Sports whose founder, Omer Kem, previously managed BMW p/b Happy Tooth Dental and Bissell Pro Cycling. The team disbanded at the end of the 2018 season.

Team history

In preparation for their first season, the team signed Shelley Olds, Rossella Ratto, and Valentina Scandolara as headline riders. The team also signed Krista Doebel-Hickok, Alison Tetrick, Erica Zaveta, Sheyla Gutiérrez, Doris Schweizer, and Kathryn Bertine.

Team roster

Major wins
2016
Winston Salem Cycling Classic, Rossella Ratto

2017
Stages 2 & 4 Santos Women's Tour, Kirsten Wild
Stage 7 Giro d'Italia Femminile, Sheyla Gutiérrez
Stage 2 Holland Ladies Tour Kirsten Wild
Rochester Cyclo-cross, Kaitlin Antonneau
Iowa City Cyclo-cross, Kaitlin Antonneau
Thompson Cyclo-cross, Kaitlin Antonneau
Baltimore I Cyclo-cross, Kaitlin Antonneau
Baltimore II Cyclo-cross, Kaitlin Antonneau
Covington Cyclo-cross, Kaitlin Antonneau

2018
 Points classification Tour of Chongming Island, Giorgia Bronzini
Stage 1, Giorgia Bronzini
 Overall Tour of Zhoushan Island, Sheyla Gutiérrez
 Points classification, Sheyla Gutiérrez
 Overall Panorama Guizhou International Women's Road Cycling Race, Sheyla Gutiérrez
Stage 1, Sheyla Gutiérrez
Stage 2 Madrid Challenge by la Vuelta, Giorgia Bronzini

National, continental and world champions
2016
 Switzerland Time Trial, Doris Schweizer
 Switzerland Road Race, Doris Schweizer
 European U23 Track (Scratch race), Rachele Barbieri
2017
 World Track Championships (Scratch race), Rachele Barbieri
 Spain Road Race, Sheyla Gutiérrez
 European Track (Elimination race), Kirsten Wild
 Netherlands Track Championships (Madison), Kirsten Wild
 Netherlands Track Championships (Omnium), Kirsten Wild
 Netherlands Track Championships (Scratch race), Kirsten Wild
2018
 Serbia Time Trial, Jelena Erić
 Serbia Road Race, Jelena Erić
 Israel Road Race, Omer Shapira

References

UCI Women's Teams
Cycling teams based in the United States
Women's sports teams in the United States
Cycling teams established in 2016
2016 establishments in the United States